Danger Mouse is a reboot animated television series developed by Brian Cosgrove. It first premiered on 28 September 2015. A reboot of the 1981 television series of the same name, the series centres around Danger Mouse (Alexander Armstrong), the self-proclaimed "World's Greatest Secret Agent", who fights against injustice with his cowardly and clumsy yet loyal sidekick Ernest Penfold (Kevin Eldon). They are employed by the absent-minded but slightly firm Colonel K (Stephen Fry) and usually assisted by the inventions of short-tempered genius Professor Squawkencluck (Shauna Macdonald). With these assets, the duo are able to defeat their adversaries, such as arch-enemy Baron Silas von Greenback (Ed Gaughan).

In April 2016, the series was renewed for a second season. As of April 2019, two series of Danger Mouse have aired, totalling 104 episodes.

Series overview

Episodes

Series 1 (2015–16)
Series 1 premiered on the 34 anniversary of the 1981 series of the same name: 28 September 2015. Originally planned to consist of 52 episode segments, the series only consisted of 50 episode segments due to four of these episodes joining to make two double-length episodes. A Christmas special, one of the double-length episodes, with Richard Ayoade and Brian Blessed was confirmed: "The Snowman Cometh".

Series 2 (2017–19)
The first two episodes of series 2 were supposed to have premiered on 24 May 2017 as part of CBBC's "Danger Mouse Day", followed by the rest of the series from 4 September 2017. However, "Danger Mouse Day" was later postponed until 14 June 2017.

Originally planned to be series 3, the 26 episodes of 11 minutes length were transferred to Series 2 to make 52 episodes and 49 episode segments overall. The first 5 new episodes of the series were shown on the BBC iPlayer, with new episode being screened on CBBC from 17 September 2018.

References

Lists of British children's television series episodes
Lists of British animated television series episodes
Danger Mouse